Pebbles, Volume 10 is a compilation album among the CDs in the Pebbles series.

Release data
This album was released on AIP Records in 1996 as #AIP-CD-5027.  Despite the similar catalogue number, there is no relation between the tracks on this CD and the tracks on the corresponding LP.  This represents the first appearance on CD of any of these songs.

Notes on the tracks
This CD begins with the opening track from the Pebbles, Volume 11 LP by the mysterious Milan, in the name of The Leather Boy in this case; a second track that was not among the three Milan songs on that LP, "On the Go" is also included.

"I Can't Stand this Love, Goodbye" is the outstanding, opening track on the first Pebbles CD, Pebbles, Volume 1, released by ESD Records (not AIP Records) in 1989.

The Canadian Squires were already known as Levon and the Hawks by this time – and had also released a single as the Hawks – and would eventually become the Band.

The Spirit were forced to change their name by the California band Spirit, although they had been using it longer.

Silver Fleet is an early effort by Jeffry Katz and Jerry Kasenetz before their bubblegum pop successes a little later in the decade.

The second, unreleased single by GONN closes out the album; their classic first single, "Blackout of Gretely" was a bonus track on the Pebbles, Volume 1 CD.

Track listing
 The Leather Boy: "I'm a Leather Boy"; rel. 1967
 The Bold: "Gotta Get Some"; rel. 1966
 The Bruthers: "Bad Way to Go"; rel. 1966
 The Canadian Squires: "Leave Me Alone"; rel. 1966?
 Clockwork Orange: "Your Golden Touch"; rel. 1967?
 Clockwork Orange: "Do Me Right Now"; rel. 1967?
 The Breakers: "Don't Send Me No Flowers (I Ain't Dead Yet)"; rel. 1965
 The Spirit: "No Time to Rhyme"; rel. 1967
 The Leather Boy: "On the Go"; rel. 1967
 The Loved Ones: "Surprise Surprise"; rel. 1966?
 Mach V: "If I Could"; rel. 1967
 The Others: "I Can't Stand This Love"; rel. 1965
 The Prophets: "Yes I Know"; rel. 1966?
 Ravin' Blue: "Love"; rel. 1966
 The Rooks: "Girl Like You, A"; rel. 1966
 The RPM's: "White Lightnin'"; rel. 1966?
 Silver Fleet: "Look Out World"; rel. 1967
 We Who Are: "Last Trip"; rel. 1967
 Steve Walker and the Bold: "Train Kept A-Rollin'"; rel. 1967
 The Teddy Boys: "Mona"; rel. 1966
 The Uncalled For: "Do Like Me"; rel. 1967
 The Kids: "Nature's Children"; rel. 1967
 Regiment: "My Soap Won't Float"; rel. 1967?
 GONN: "Doin' Me In"; rel. 1966

References

Pebbles (series) albums
1996 compilation albums